Sallie Tisdale, (born 1957) is an American writer and essayist whose work has appeared in Harper’s, The New Yorker, The New York Times, and Tricycle, among other magazines. She is the author of ten books, and winner of numerous literary awards.
Earning a nursing degree in 1983 and writing in her off-hours from medical practice, her first book was on medical miracles (1986), her second on day to day life in a nursing home (1987), which was followed that year by an essay in Harper's  on working in an abortion clinic. Tisdale currently teaches part-time in the writing program at Portland State University.

Awards and honors
Regional Arts and Culture Council Literary Fellowship
Pushcart Prize
NEA Fellowship
The James Phelan Literary Award 
The Dorothy and Arthur Shoenfeldt Distinguished Writer of the Year

Bibliography
The Sorcerer’s Apprentice (McGraw-Hill, NY, 1986) 
Harvest Moon (Henry Holt, NY, 1987) 
Lot’s Wife (Henry Holt, NY, 1988) 
Stepping Westward (Henry Holt, NY, 1992) 
Talk Dirty to Me (Doubleday, NY, 1994) 
The Best Thing I Ever Tasted (Riverhead Books, NY, 2000) 
Women of the Way (HarperCollins, San Francisco, 2006)  
Violation: Collected Essays (Hawthorne Books, Portland, 2016) 
Advice for Future Corpses (And Those Who Love Them) (Touchstone Books, NY, 2018) 
The Lie About the Truck: Survivor, Reality TV, and the Endless Gaze (Simon and Schuster, NY, 2021)

References

1957 births
American women essayists
Portland State University faculty
Living people
20th-century American essayists
20th-century American women writers
21st-century American essayists
21st-century American women writers
National Endowment for the Arts Fellows
American women academics